The Colyer House is a historic home located at Schoharie in Schoharie County, New York.  It was built about 1795 is a 2-story, five-bay brick Federal-style house, with a -story kitchen wing. Minor alterations were made during the Greek Revival period. It features a slate gable roof.

It was listed on the National Register of Historic Places in 2008.

References

Houses on the National Register of Historic Places in New York (state)
Federal architecture in New York (state)
Houses completed in 1795
Houses in Schoharie County, New York
National Register of Historic Places in Schoharie County, New York